Iuliano is an Italian surname. Notable people with the surname include:

Mark Iuliano (born 1973), Italian footballer and manager
Rino Iuliano (born 1984), Italian footballer
Robert Iuliano, American attorney and academic administrator

Italian-language surnames